= William H. Huff III =

American lawyer and politician

Member of the Iowa House of Representatives
- In office 1969–1971

Personal details
- Born: June 24, 1937 (age 89) Davenport, Iowa, United States
- Party: Republican
- Occupation: lawyer

William H. Huff III (born June 24, 1937) was an American politician in the state of Iowa.

Huff was born in Davenport, Iowa. He was a lawyer. He served in the Iowa House of Representatives from 1969 to 1971 as a Republican.
